The Fantastic Ordinary World of Lutz Rathenow: Poems, Plays & Stories, by Lutz Rathenow, is a book of poems, plays and stories written originally in German.

Synopsis 
A bilingual edition of satires, skits and grotesqueries conveying the maddening humdrumness of the ultimate police state.

Summary 
"The world Berlin author Lutz Rathenow depicts is the colorless, flat, thuddingly dull DDR — the German Democratic Republic, as it called itself, or Communist East Germany, as we knew it: a sub-Soviet, sub-standard, bureaucratic parody of a society (1949-1990). And he depicts it very well, only not from the outside, with detailed descriptions, historical costumes and polemical plots, but rather from the inside, dropping in on the mind of one or another of its characters. Here is the little man starved of human contact and longing for romance ('The Girl in Finland'), the timid bureaucrat standing in front of an office door and wondering how to knock ('Mr. Breugel), the writer facing the blank page and fearing both to write and not to write ('The Blank Page'). Here, in other words, is Angst, paralysis, a funnel of doubt and indecision. Out of it comes murderous resentment ('Professor Dr. Mitzenleim'), mocking defiance ('Reasons for Refusing to Make a Statement'), ironic futility ('Meditations on Peace'). People who are emotionally starved, anxious and futile develop a perverse sense of humor ('The Phone Call'); they find grim little pleasures in their living death ('Obituary').

"Rathenow's works crystallize not only a past, but also a present and recurring assault on the mind. The government, the political party, the church, the organization, the television program, the newspaper, the company, the office, the boss all want you to think the same way, their way, whatever the country and whatever the time. And if you do, this is what results: reduced capacity, distorted thought, fragmented language, inverted feelings, a sense of unreality, a drabness unto death. The Fantastic Ordinary World of Lutz Rathenow draws this lesson and thus the pleasure out of the painful republic.
~ From the Introduction by Karl Kvitko

Editions 
Translated from the German by Boria Sax & Imogen von Tannenberg, with an Introduction by Boria Sax; illustrations by Robyn Johnson-Ross & Boris Mukhametshin. Grand Terrace, CA: Xenos Books.   (paper), 176 p.

Fantastic Ordinary World of Lutz Rathenow: Poems, Plays and Stories